Vina Department  is a department (département) of the Adamawa Province in Cameroon.
The department covers an area of 17,196 km and as of 2001 had a total population of 247,427. The capital of the department lies at Ngaoundéré.

Subdivisions
The department is divided administratively into 7 communes and in turn into villages.

Communes
 Belel
 Mbe
 Nganha
 Ngaoundéré (urban)
 Ngaoundéré (rural)
 Nyambaka
 Martap

References

Departments of Cameroon
Adamawa Region